Javier Gerardo Milei (born 22 October 1970) is an Argentine politician, businessman and economist currently serving as a federal deputy of Buenos Aires and leader of the political coalition La Libertad Avanza.

Milei became widely known for his regular television appearances where he has been critical of the Cristina Fernández de Kirchner, Mauricio Macri and Alberto Fernández administrations. Milei is supportive of the Austrian School of economic thought and considers himself to be a "short-term minarchist", although "philosophically an anarcho-capitalist". Since 2021, Milei has been a National Deputy in Buenos Aires for La Libertad Avanza coalition. He has pledged not to vote for any tax raises or new taxes.

Milei is currently running as a candidate for the 2023 Argentine presidential election.

Early life and youth 
Milei was born in 1970 to a bus driver, in a family of Hungarian descent. Milei attended Cardenal Copello high school and decided to pursue a career in economics at the age of 12 after José Alfredo Martínez de Hoz's economic administration led the country to hyperinflation. In late adolescence and early adulthood he was a goalkeeper for Chacarita Juniors until 1989. He also sang in the band Everest, which played mostly Rolling Stones covers.

Career 
Milei obtained an economics degree at the private Belgrano University (Licentiate) and received two master's degrees from the Instituto de Desarrollo Económico y Social (IDES) and the private Torcuato di Tella University. He became a chief economist at Máxima AFJP (a private pension company), a head economist at Estudio Broda (a financial advising company) and a government consultant at the International Centre for Settlement of Investment Disputes. He was also formerly a senior economist at HSBC.

Since 2012, he leads the division of Economic Studies, Fundación Acordar, a think tank of national scope. He is also a member of the B20, the Economic Policy Group of International Chamber of Commerce (an advisor to the G20), and the World Economic Forum. He is a specialist in economic growth and has been professor of several economic subjects in Argentine universities and abroad. He has authored nine books. Currently, he works for Argentine tycoon Eduardo Eurnekián.

For more than 21 years Milei has been a professor of macroeconomics, economics of growth, microeconomics and mathematics for economists. Since 2016 he has been trying to merge Austrian economics concepts with Monetarism concepts, as he understands Ben Bernanke was the greatest central banker ever. Besides his academic career, Milei is the host of his own radio show named Demoliendo mitos (Demolishing myths), with frequent participations of the Alberdian economist and businessman Gustavo Lazzari and other personalities such as the Alberdian lawyer Pablo Torres Barthe and the libertarian political scientist María Zaldívar.

Political career 
Political commentators have classified his ideological views as a mix of conservative and libertarian. 

Milei is a supporter of former Brazilian president Jair Bolsonaro and former U.S. president Donald Trump. However, he rejected the 2023 invasion of the Brazilian Congress, claiming that democracy must be supported under all circumstances, and criticizing the people who only manifest such concerns when it benefits rulers from their political alignment. He is also close to the Spanish conservative party Vox, and former conservative Chilean presidential candidate José Antonio Kast. Milei signed the Madrid Charter, a document drafted by Vox that describes left-wing groups as enemies of Ibero-America involved in a "criminal project," that are "under the umbrella of the Cuban regime". He signed the document along with other politicians such as Antonio Kast of Chile, Rafael López Aliaga of Peru, and Bolsonaro's son Eduardo of Brazil. 

Milei opposes abortion. Asked by a journalist about a hypothetical extreme case of abortion after the rape of a 10 years-old girl, Milei questioned whether one crime can be compensated by another, and argued that a murder, as he considers abortion to be, can never be justified.

Milei is a believer in the cultural Marxism conspiracy theory. He denies the existence of climate change, saying that it is an invention of cultural Marxism. Milei also links cultural Marxism with the Ministry of Women and says that if he is elected president he will close that ministry. He has also mentioned cultural Marxism to criticize the LGBT movements.

Milei claims to be anarcho-capitalist. He often referred to Carlos Menem, President of Argentina from 1989 to 1999, and his Minister of Economy Domingo Cavallo.

Milei created the coalition La Libertad Avanza (Freedom Moves Forward) and surprised in the September 2021 primary elections, coming third in the city of Buenos Aires with 13.66% of the vote. Campaigning under the slogan "I didn't come here to lead lambs but to awaken lions", he denounced the "political caste", which he claimed to be made up of "useless, parasitic politicians who have never worked."

A Mendoza-based polling firm has carried out an innovative study on the most likely candidates to run for president of Argentina in 2023 and found that Milei was deemed the "lesser evil".

Personal life 
Milei has been nicknamed "el Peluca" (the Wig) because of his eccentric hairstyle. He has repeatedly said he does not comb his hair, and for this reason his hairstyle has received significant media attention. Regarding his romantic life he has suggested in a La Nación interview that he is a champion of free love, and in a local television program stated that he took part in several threesomes and that he is a Tantra instructor, in his words being "capable of remaining three months without ejaculating." Nevertheless he identifies as a Catholic, who rejects the magisterium of the Church. With regards to abortion, he has publicly expressed a strong pro-life position.

He owns five english mastiffs, the progenitor being Conan, whom he regards as his "son", and four of Conan's pups called Milton (for Milton Friedman), Murray (for Murray Rothbard), Robert and Lucas (both for Robert Lucas). Milei declared that he used to be extremely distant with his parents and even considered them "dead" for him. However during his political campaign he reconciled with both his father and mother.

Electoral history

Legislative

Radio

Books 
 Lecturas de Economía en tiempos de Kirchnerismo (in English: Economic Readings in times of Kirchnerism, 2014), 
 Política Económica Contrarreloj (in English: Economic Politics Against the Clock, 2014), 
 El retorno al sendero de la Decadencia Argentina (in English: The return to the road of Argentinian Decadence, 2015), 
 Maquinita, Infleta y Devaluta (in English: Money Printer, Inflation and Devaluation, 2016), with Diego Giacomini. 
 Otra vez sopa: maquinita, infleta y devaluta: ensayos de economía monetaria para el caso argentino (in English: Soup again: money printer, inflation and devaluation: monetary economy essays for the Argentine case, 2017), with Diego Giacomini. 
 Desenmascarando la mentira Keynesiana. Keynes, Friedman y el triunfo de la Escuela Austriaca. (in English: Unmasking the Keynesian lie. Keynes, Friedman and the triumph of the Austrian School. 2018), 
 Libertad, libertad, libertad. (in English: Liberty, Liberty, Liberty, 2019), with Diego Giacomini. 
 Pandenomics. La economía que viene en tiempos de megarrecesión, inflación y crisis global. (in English: Pandenomics: The coming economy in times of mega recession, inflation and global crisis, 2020) 
 El camino del libertario. (in English: The path of the libertarian, 2022)

Selected academic articles 
 (2004) 'Real Exchange Rate Targeting. ¿Trilema Monetario o Control de Capitales? La Política Fiscal', Revista de Economía y Estadística, Universidad Nacional de Córdoba, Facultad de Ciencias Económicas, Instituto de Economía y Finanzas, vol. 0(2), pp. 63–87, January.
 (2014) 'De los picapiedras a los supersónicos: Maravillas del progreso tecnológico con convergencia', Revista Actualidad Económica, Universidad Nacional de Córdoba, Facultad de Ciencias Económicas, Instituto de Economía y Finanzas, vol. 0(83), pp. 5–18.
 (2017) 'Ensayos Monetarios para Economías Abiertas: El Caso Argentino' (with Diego Giacomini), Revista Actualidad Económica, Universidad Nacional de Córdoba, Facultad de Ciencias Económicas, Instituto de Economía y Finanzas, vol. 0(91), pp. 5–24.

References

External links 

 
 
 
 
 

1970 births
Living people
Politicians from Buenos Aires
Argentine libertarians
Argentine economists
Argentine businesspeople
Argentine radio presenters
Argentine Internet celebrities
Argentine Roman Catholics
Chacarita Juniors footballers
Critics of multiculturalism
Argentine anti-communists
Anarcho-capitalists
Minarchists
Growth economists
Argentine writers
Libertarian economists
Libertarianism in Argentina
Libertarianism in South America
Right-wing populism in South America
Signers of the Madrid Charter
Members of the Argentine Chamber of Deputies elected in Buenos Aires
Leaders of political parties in Argentina